Chris Johnston (born 3 September 1994) is a Scottish professional footballer who plays as a winger for Scottish League Two club Annan Athletic.

Career
A member of Kilmarnock's under-19 squad, Johnston was promoted to the first team on 14 January 2012, where he was an unused substitute in their match against Aberdeen. He went on to make his debut aged 17, on 24 March as a second-half substitute in a 2–0 win over Motherwell. On 23 May 2016, he was one of six players released at the end of their contract.

On 6 June 2016, it was announced that Johnston had signed for Raith Rovers on a one-year deal. He left the club following their relegation to Scottish League One, and joined Scottish Championship side Dumbarton in July 2017, after impressing during a trial period with the club. After finding his opportunities at the Rock limited, he joined Scottish League Two side Peterhead on loan in February 2018, and was released by Dumbarton at the end of the 2017–18 season.

Johnston signed for Annan Athletic in June 2018 and was nominated for PFA Scotland Players' Player of the Year and named in the League Two Team of the Season in his first campaign with the club.

Upon the expiration of his Annan contract, Johnston signed for Scottish League One side Clyde in May 2019. He was released by Clyde in March 2021.

In July 2021, Johnston returned to Annan Athletic, signing with the club for a second time.

Career statistics

References

External links

1994 births
Living people
Footballers from Irvine, North Ayrshire
Scotland youth international footballers
Scottish footballers
Association football forwards
Kilmarnock F.C. players
Raith Rovers F.C. players
Dumbarton F.C. players
Peterhead F.C. players
Annan Athletic F.C. players
Clyde F.C. players
Scottish Premier League players
Scottish Professional Football League players